Salay is a town located in Chauk Township, Magway District, Magway Region, Myanmar (Burma).

Salay developed as a satellite town of Bagan in the 12th and 13th centuries and is still an important religious center. Salay houses 50 active Buddhist monasteries, including the Yokesone Monastery, as well as Bagan-era monuments like the Man Buddha Image. Salay is a center for lacquerware manufacturing.

Salay is also known as the birthplace of U Ponnya, one of Burma's most celebrated writers.

References

Populated places in Magway Region